
AD 100 (C) was a leap year starting on Wednesday (link will display the full calendar) of the Julian calendar. In the Roman Empire, it was sometimes referred to as year 853 ab urbe condita, i.e., 853 years since the founding of Rome in 753 B.C. The denomination AD 100 for this year has been used since the early medieval period, when the Anno Domini calendar era became the prevalent method in Europe for naming years.

The year saw of Pacores, the last king of the Indo-Parthian Kingdom, ascend to the throne. In the Americas, the Moche culture developed around this time, and Teotihuacan, a major city at the centre of modern-day Mexico, reached a population of around 60,000-80,000.

Events

By place

Roman Empire 

 Emperor Trajan and Sextus Julius Frontinus become Roman Consuls.
 Bricks become the primary building material in the Roman Empire.
 Pliny the Younger advances to consulship, giving his panegyric on Trajan in the process.
 The Roman Army reaches 300,000 soldiers.
 Titus Avidius Quietus' rule as governor of Roman Britain ends.
 Timgad (Thamugas), a Roman colonial town in North Africa, is founded by Trajan.
 Trajan creates a policy intended to restore the former economic supremacy of Italy.
 The future emperor, Hadrian, marries Vibia Sabina.

Europe 

 Lions have become extinct in Greece by this year.

Asia 

 Pakores (last king of the Indo-Parthian Kingdom) takes the throne.
 Paper is used by the general populace in China, starting around this year.
 The Kingdom of Himyarite is conquered by the Hadramaut.

Americas 

 The Hopewell tradition begins in what is now Ohio c. this date.
 Teotihuacan, a major city at the centre of modern-day Mexico, reaches a population of around 60,000-80,000.
 The Moche civilization emerges, and starts building a society in present-day Peru.

By topic

Arts and sciences 
 In China, the wheelbarrow makes its first appearance.
 Main hall, Markets of Trajan, Rome, is made (until AD 112).

Religion 
 Appearance of the first Christian dogma and formulas regarding morality.
 The Gospel of John is widely believed to have been written around this date.
 The compilation of the Kama sutra begins in India.
 The Temple of the God of Medicine is built in Anguo, China.
 The Fourth Buddhist Council is convened c. this year.

Births 
 Fa Zhen (or Gaoqing), Chinese scholar (d. 188)
 Faustina the Elder, Roman empress
 Justin Martyr, Christian apologist and saint (approximate date)
 Marcus Cornelius Fronto, Roman grammarian, rhetorician and advocate (d. 170)
 Ptolemy, Greek astrologer, astronomer, geographer and mathematician (d. 170)
 Quintus Junius Rusticus, Roman teacher and politician (approximate date)
 Quintus Tineius Sacerdos Clemens, Roman politician (approximate date)

Deaths 
 Agrippa II, Jewish king of Judea (b. AD 27)
 Apollonius of Tyana, Greek philosopher (b. AD 15) 
 Josephus, Jewish historian and writer (b. AD 37)
 John the Apostle of Jesus Christ (b. AD 6)
 Wang Chong, Chinese philosopher (b. AD 27)

References